Dissen is an unincorporated community in western Franklin County, in the U.S. state of Missouri. The community is located on the north side of Boeuf Creek along Missouri Route Y and four miles southwest of New Haven.

History
A post office called Dissen was established in 1899, and remained in operation until 1909. The community took its name from Dissen, a town in Germany.

References

Unincorporated communities in Franklin County, Missouri
Unincorporated communities in Missouri